{{Speciesbox
|genus = Brachyptera
|species = putata
|authority = (Newman, 1838)
|synonyms =
Nemoura putata Newman, 1838
|synonyms_ref = 
}}Brachyptera putata'', the northern February red, is a species of stonefly in the family Taeniopterygidae.

Description
Adult males are poorer fliers than females, due to their short wings.
They tend to be very aggressive during mating.

Distribution
The species used to live in England and Wales, but now it considered to be an endemic of Scotland. Its main habitat used to be River Usk in Wales, and Wye, England.

Ecology
The larva of the species is feeding on algae. The species prefers cold water.

Threat level
The species is considered to be locally extinct in England and Wales due to sheep, cattle, and farming. Since 2001 the Countryside Council for Wales had not recorded any comeback of the species in Wales or England. However, the species were found in rivers of Scotland, including in the ones that never had them before.

References

Taeniopterygidae
Insects of Europe
Taxa named by Edward Newman
Insects described in 1838